Christa Eka Assam is a Cameroonian film actress and director. Her work in Cameroonian cinema has been critically acclaimed.

Biography
A self taught actress, Eka decided to become one during 2008.

Filmography
Ninah's Dowry (2012, as Clarise)
Beleh (2013)
Alma (2015)

Eka also produced, directed and wrote Beleh and Alma.

External links

Cameroonian actresses
Cameroonian women film directors
Cameroonian women film producers
Year of birth missing (living people)
Living people